1st SDFCS Awards
December 28, 1996

Best Film: 
 Fargo 
The 1st San Diego Film Critics Society Awards, given by the San Diego Film Critics Society on 28 December 1996, honored the best in film for 1996.

Winners
Best Actor: 
Kenneth Branagh - Hamlet
Best Actress: 
Frances McDormand - Fargo
Best Director: 
Joel Coen - Fargo
Best Film: 
'''Fargo
Best Foreign Language Film:
Ridicule  (French)
Best Supporting Actor: 
Armin Mueller-Stahl - Shine
Best Supporting Actress: 
Lauren Bacall - The Mirror Has Two Faces

1
1996 film awards
1996 in American cinema